Hans De Jong (March 25, 1932 – February 6, 2014) was a Canadian politician. He served in the Legislative Assembly of British Columbia from 1986 to 1994, as a Social Credit member for the constituencies of Central Fraser Valley and Abbotsford.

Biography
In 1947, after World War II, he immigrated to Canada with his parents and siblings.  They settled in the Abbotsford area and established themselves in farming.  In 1950, de Jong met his wife, Ann. They were married in 1954 and started their lives together on a dairy farm in Deroche where de Jong successfully built his farming business.  In the spring of 1962 they moved to Matsqui and continued dairy farming. They had five children.

Political career

In 1971, de Jong ran for political office and served as an alderman until 1975 and then Mayor (1975–1987) for the District of Matsqui. In 1986, de Jong was elected MLA for the Social Credit Party.  He served in Victoria for several years including a position as Minister of Agriculture and Aquaculture. In 2013, de Jong was awarded the Queen’s Diamond Jubilee Medal for his service to the community.

References

1932 births
2014 deaths
British Columbia municipal councillors
British Columbia Social Credit Party MLAs
Dairy farmers
Dutch emigrants to Canada
Farmers from British Columbia
Mayors of places in British Columbia
Members of the Executive Council of British Columbia
People from Abbotsford, British Columbia
People from De Fryske Marren